Beckenham is a town in the London Borough of Bromley, England. The following is a list of those people who were either born or live in Beckenham, or else had important connections to make to the town.

A
Raymond Adamson (1920–2002), television actor
Rory Allen (born 1977), football player
Julie Andrews (born 1935), actress, singer, author
Claude Ashton (1901–1942), football player, cricketer, hockey player
Gerald Aste (1900–1961), cricketer

B
A.L. Barker (1918–2002), novelist, short story writer
Django Bates (born 1960), composer; multi-instrumentalist, band leader
Hugh Bean (1929–2003), violinist
Floella Benjamin (born 1949), actress, singer and TV presenter
John Bennett (1928–2005), actor
Enid Blyton (1897–1968), children’s writer
Frank Bourne (1984–1945), Anglo-Zulu War veteran
David Bowie (1947–2016), musician, actor, producer, arranger
Zowie Bowie (born 1971), film director (and son of David Bowie)
Betty Box (1915–1999), film producer and screenwriter
Sydney Box (1907–1983),  film producer and screenwriter
Tony Bradman (born 1954), children’s author
Peircy Brett (1709–1781), admiral in Royal Navy; politician
Bob Broadbent (1924–1993), cricketer
Ali Brown (born 1970), cricketer
Godfrey Bryan (1902–1991), cricketer
 Jack Bryan (1896–1985), cricketer
Ronnie Bryan (1898–1970), cricketer
Stuart Bunce (born 1971), actor
Arthur Gardiner Butler (1844–1925), entomologist

C
Pat Coombs (1926–2002), actress
James Cossins (1933–1997), actor

D
Richard Daintree (1831–1878), geologist and photographer
T. Pelham Dale (1821–1892), Anglo-Catholic ritualist clergyman
Samuel Daukes (1811–1880), architect
Maurice Denham (1909–2002), actor

E
George Eden, 1st Earl of Auckland (1784–1849), politician and colonial administrator
William Eden, 1st Baron Auckland (1745–1814), politician and diplomat
Carl Erhardt (1897–1988), ice hockey player

F
Liam Fontaine (born 1986), football player
Philip Fotheringham-Parker (1907–1981), racing driver
Peter Frampton (born 1950), singer-songwriter and musician

H
Haircut 100, New wave/Jazz-funk band formed in 1980 by Nick Heyward
John Pennington Harman (1914–1944), recipient of the Victoria Cross
David Haye, boxer
Alec Hearne (1863–1952), cricketer
Nick Heyward (born 1961), singer, guitarist
Leigh Hinds (born 1978), football player
C. Walter Hodges (1909–2004), illustrator and author
Elizabeth Hope (1842–1922), evangelist; temperance movement
Charles Howard (1904–1982), cricketer

J
Steve Jansen (born 1959), musician
Graham Johnson (born 1946), cricketer

K
Georgina Kennedy (born 1997), professional squash player (Commonwealth Games champion 2022)
Robert Key (born 1979), cricketer
Daniel King (born 1963), chess player; writer and journalist
John Kingman (born 1939), mathematician

L
Kate Lawler (born 1980), TV presenter, disc jockey, winner of Big Brother UK
Alfred Layman (1858–1940), cricketer
Mark Lovell (born 1983), football player

M
Andrew Manze (born 1965), baroque violinist and conductor
Piers Merchant (1951–2009), politician
Bob Monkhouse (1928–2003), entertainer
Ivor Moreton (1908–1984), singer and pianist, lived in Beckenham during World War II

O
John Orchard (1928–1995),  film actor (M*A*S*H)
Jonathan Orders (born 1957), cricketer

P
Arthur Beresford Pite (1861–1934), architect
Mary Potter (1900–1981), painter
James Pigott Pritchett (1789–1868), architect
Frank Pullen (1915–1992), businessman and builder

R
Cornthwaite Rason (1858–1927), Premier of Western Australia
Dorothy Richardson (1873–1957), novelist
Christopher Ricks (born 1933), literary critic
Ken Ritchie (born 1946), psephologist

S
Stanley Scott (1854–1933), cricketer
Richard Smith (born 1971), fingerstyle guitarist
Wende Snijders (born 1978),  Dutch singer
Frank Spenlove-Spenlove (1868–1933), painter; founder of "Yellow Door School of Art" in Beckenham
David Sylvian (born 1958), singer, musician, composer

T
Richard Thorpe (born 1984),  rugby union player

V
Paul Volley (born 1975), rugby union player

W
Wavell Wakefield, 1st Baron Wakefield of Kendal (1898–1983), rugby union player and politician
Bill Wyman, bass guitarist, member of  the Rolling Stones, lived at 44 Birkbeck Road, Beckenham in the 1960s

References

People from Beckenham
Lists of people from London